Le Loyon, also known as the Ghost of Maules, is an urban legend concerning a supposed humanoid figure that was said to roam the forest near the village of Maules (Sâles), Switzerland. Le Loyon was described as a tall humanoid creature dressed in a boilersuit, a cloak and a gas mask which covers its entire head.

Appearance 

It wears a dark (black or dark gray) boilersuit and covers itself with a greenish camouflage cloak. Most notably, it wears an old gas mask that covers its entire head.

Sightings 
The first sightings of Le Loyon date back to the late 1990s or early 2000s. In one of the reported sightings, a local woman claimed to have seen Le Loyon picking flowers on the trail and was startled to be seen by her. There are several theories concerning Le Loyon's identity, for example – some claim it might be a mentally ill woman, a gigantic man, someone suffering from a skin condition, or a survivalist.

In September 2013, a Swiss French-language newspaper Le Matin published the first known photograph of Le Loyon, taken by an unnamed amateur photographer. After the photo began to circulate online, Le Matin reported that Le Loyon's cloak and gas mask were supposedly found in the Maules Forest, along with a note written by Le Loyon, titled "Death Certificate and Testament of the Ghost of Maules". The note claimed that Le Loyon knew of the viral photograph, and was unpleased with the unwanted attention it brought to the forest. Since then, there have been no more reported sightings of Le Loyon in the Maules Forest. One of the theories claim that the figure was an eccentric local who was afraid of being linked to Le Loyon, and abandoned their costumed walks as a result. However, the way the note was worded led some to believe that Le Loyon had committed suicide.

References 

Urban legends
Unidentified people
Swiss folklore